Uncial 0114 (in the Gregory-Aland numbering), ε 53 (von Soden); is a Greek–Coptic diglot uncial manuscript of the New Testament, dated palaeographically to the 8th-century.

Description 

The codex contains a small part of the Gospel of John, 20:4-6,8-10, on one very large parchment leaf. The size of the page is rather unusual. It is about 39 cm by 30 cm. The text is written in two columns per page, 32 lines per page, in uncial letters. It was classified as an uncial codex, but, according to the opinion of modern scholars, it is a lectionary. It is classified on Aland's List of New Testament lectionaries as ℓ 965.

The Greek text of this codex is a representative of the Alexandrian text-type. Aland placed it in Category II. This means it has some alien readings.

Currently it is dated by the INTF to the 8th-century.

The codex now is located at the Bibliothèque nationale de France (Copt. 129,10, fol. 198), in Paris.

See also 

 List of New Testament uncials
 List of New Testament lectionaries
 Coptic versions of the Bible
 Textual criticism
 Uncial 0127
 Uncial 0128

References

Further reading 

 E. Amélineau, "Notice des manuscrits coptes de la Bibliothèque nationale renfermant des textes bilingues du Nouveau Testament. Notices et extraits des manuscrits de la Bibliothèque nationale et autres bibliothèques", tome XXXIV, 2e partie NEMBM 34/2 (Paris: 1895), pp. 407–408.

Uncial 0114
Uncial 0114
Lectionary 965
Uncial 0114
Bibliothèque nationale de France collections